Shaka (Gupta script:  Sha-kā) may have been one of the last rulers of the Kushan Empire around 325-345. He may have succeeded Vasudeva II. There is a group of Kushan gold coins that all carry the Brahmi legend Shaka in the right field, in the same place where Vasudeva II's coins read Vasu, so it is natural to suppose that perhaps Shaka was the name of the king who issued these coins. A further support for this idea is that there is a mention of one "Devaputra Shahi Shahanshahi Shaka Murunda" in Samudragupta's famous Allahabad inscription, as one of the rulers who paid him homage. In this context, Shaka could be a title, it could refer to a tribe, or it could be a personal name. In any case, it seems to be related to the Shaka coins. Unfortunately, we don't know the date of the Allahabad inscription, so the best guess on dating Shaka is c. mid-4th century.

Robert Göbl, for instance, did not think Shaka was the name of a ruler; rather, he thought the coins were tribal issues, but Michael Mitchiner  and many other authors do think Shaka was a personal name.

The Shaha coins all have the goddess Ardoxsho on the reverse, whether many other Kushan rulers are known to have used Oesho (probably Shiva with his bull) on the reverse of their coins.

There are also sources who use the term Shaka-Kushan as a label for a historic period that began sometime between 78 A.D. and 128 A.D. This included the reign of rulers bearing the name of Vasudeva. It was associated with several excavated remains in northern India, which revealed building activities as well as artifacts like red polished pottery, ceramics, and terracotta figures. The discovered remains showed sophisticated construction practices like the use of burnt bricks for flooring and tiles for flooring and roofing. The wares, including some coins, found in the Shaka-Kushana sites were also found in several locations in Delhi, Jhatikra Nahar near Najafgarh, and Gordon Highlanders near Badli ki Sarai. Archaeologists believe that this indicates contact among these contemporary settlements or that these sites were under the sphere of influence of the Shaka-Kushana empire.

Footnotes

External links
 Online catalogue of coins of Shaka

Kushan emperors
3rd-century Indian monarchs